Schmidt's LOGIN is a German software company founded in 1987 by Joerg-W. Schmidt and Roland Loetzerich, who is still the managing director. The company is privately held and headquartered in Munich, Germany.

Even though Schmidt left the company in 1992, his name is still part of the company name because of registered trademarks.

The company's flagship product is the network inventory tool LOGINventory.

References 

Software companies of Germany